Font Mountain is located on the border of Alberta and British Columbia on the Continental Divide.

See also
List of peaks on the Alberta–British Columbia border
Mountains of British Columbia

References

Two-thousanders of Alberta
Two-thousanders of British Columbia
Canadian Rockies